Cobalt(II) hydride is an inorganic compound with a chemical formula CoH2. It has dark grey crystals. It oxidizes slowly in air and reacts with water.

Two forms of cobalt(II) hydride exist under high pressure. From 4 to 45 GPa there is a face-centred cubic form with formula CoH. This can be decompressed at low temperatures to form a metastable compound at atmospheric pressure. Over 45 GPa a cobalt(II) hydride CoH2 also crystallises in a face-centred cubic form.

Preparation
Cobalt(II) hydride can prepared by reacting phenylmagnesium bromide and cobalt(II) chloride in hydrogen gas:

CoCl2 + 2 C6H5MgBr + 2 H2 → CoH2 + 2 C6H6 + MgBr2 + MgCl2

References

Cobalt compounds
Metal hydrides